Charles James Graham was a politician in Queensland, Australia. He was a Member of the Queensland Legislative Assembly. Graham represented the electorate of Clermont from 11 May 1872 to 4 January 1876.

Early life 

Charles James Graham was born on 7 October 1839 in Hinxton, Cambridgeshire, England. He was educated at Uppingham and Peterhouse, graduating with a BA in 1862 before moving to Australia where he was a squatter.

Family 

He married Mary Joseph Enright on 21 September 1871, and they had three children.

Politics 

Graham was the Secretary for Public Lands from 15 July 1873 to 8 January 1874.

Later life 
After resigning from Parliament he was appointed Under Secretary for Public Instruction.

Director-General of Education 1876–1878

Later he became the editor (and later sole owner) of the Peak Downs Telegram. 
 
He later moved to Orange, New South Wales where he operated a brewery.

Graham died on 18 March 1886 in Albany, Western Australia, Australia.

References

Members of the Queensland Legislative Assembly
1839 births
1886 deaths
People from South Cambridgeshire District
19th-century Australian politicians
19th-century Australian public servants